Chifeng, also known as Ulanhad ( (Улаанхад хот), Ulaɣanqada qota, "red cliff"), is a prefecture-level city in Southeastern Inner Mongolia, People's Republic of China. It borders Xilin Gol League to the north and west, Tongliao to the northeast, Chaoyang (Liaoning) to the southeast and Chengde (Hebei) to the south. However, 1,175,391 of those residents lived in the built-up (or metro) area made of the 2 urban districts of Hongshan and Songshan, as Yuanbaoshan is not conurbated yet. However, a large part of Songshan is still rural and Yuanbaoshan is a de facto separate town 27 kilometers away from the core district of Chifeng. The city was the administrative center of the defunct Ju Ud League.

History

According to archeological studies, human occupation of the Chifeng area can be traced back at least ten thousand years, and Neolithic cultural history can be traced back nearly eight thousand years. Representative ruins and relics of Hongshan Culture, Grassland Bronze Culture, Khitan Liao Culture and Mongol-Yuan Culture have been discovered in Chifeng. The ruins of an ancient village, named Xinglongwa, and the biggest jade dragon unearthed in the area are noted as "the first village" and "the first dragon" by some. The discovery of ruins and relics of ancient cultures have come from more than 6,800 sites. Named after Chifeng's Hongshan District, Hongshan Culture was a Neolithic culture in northeastern China, whose sites have been found mainly in Chifeng, and dated from about 4700 to 2900 BC.

Chifeng was the political, economic and cultural center of the Liao Dynasty, therefore, the amount of ruins and relics of the Liao Dynasty in Chifeng is ranked the most important in China. During the Qing Dynasty, today's Chifeng region was under the administration of 'Ju Ud League', one of the six original Leagues in Inner Mongolia. Mongolian Banners (county level regions) were organized into conventional assemblies at the league level. In republican era, Chifeng was under the administration of Rehe Province, along with parts of today's Liaoning and Hebei including Chaoyang and Chengde. After the Mukden Incident in 1931, the Japanese puppet state Manchukuo was established in Hsinking (today's Jilin provincial capital Changchun), and Juud League was captured by Manchukuo in 1933. Chifeng was established as the third largest city of Rehe Province after Chengde and Chaoyang.  After Operation August Storm, the Soviet-Mongolian Cavalry-Mechanized Group entered Chifeng. After Rehe Province was rendered defunct in 1955, Chifeng was placed administratively under the newly established Inner Mongolia Autonomous Region under CCP rule, whose provincial seat was previously at Ulanhot and transferred to Zhangjiakou and then Hohhot in the 1950s. In the 1970s, going by the name Juud League, Chifeng was under the administration of Liaoning province. After 1979, Chifeng was under Inner Mongolian rule, and Juud League was dissolved on October 10, 1983.

Geography

Chifeng is situated along the upper reaches of the Xiliao River. Within its area are the southwesternmost extension of the Greater Khingan, the Inner Mongolia Plateau as well as the Xiliao River Plain, and finally the northernmost extent of the Yan Mountains. Bordering prefecture-level divisions are Tongliao to the northeast, Chaoyang (Liaoning) to the southeast, Chengde (Hebei) to the south, and the Xilingol League and to the west. From north to south Chifeng City stretches , while from east to west it stretches .

Climate
Chifeng has a four-season, monsoon-influenced, continental semi-arid climate (Köppen BSk), with long, cold, windy, but dry winters, and hot, humid summers. Nearly half of the year's rainfall occurs in July and August, and even then dry and sunny weather dominates the city. With monthly percent possible sunshine ranging from 55% in July to 71% in January and February, sunshine is abundant year-round, and the city receives 2,866 hours of bright sunshine annually, about 65% of the possible total.

Administrative divisions

Chifeng has three districts, two counties and seven banners:

Demographics
In 2004, Chifeng had 4,435,737 inhabitants (49.14 per km2).

Economy

During the period of "the 10th Five-Year Plan", Chifeng conducted the strategy of "found the municipality by ecology, strengthen the municipality by industry, prosper the municipality by science and education", by strengthening the development of resources, and seizing the historic opportunity of Western Development.

Following the strategy, Chifeng began tightening up ecological and infrastructure construction, actively promoting the process of agricultural and animal husbandry industrialization, industrialization and urbanization, greatly encouraging the development of service industry and county-level economy, trying to expand the general economy volume, increasing industry level, and enhancing the core competition.

As a result, the social economy development quickly. Currently, the industrial economic system dominated with minerals, energy, medicines and foods and the agricultural and animal husbandry industrialization development structure dominated with meat, milk, vegetables and grass in Chifeng has been initially taking into shape. Chifeng has become the base of agriculture and animal husbandry and industry of the eastern part of Inner Mongolia. Compared with those of the end of "the 9th Five-Year Plan", GDP of the municipality, average regional GDP and the fiscal income doubled, the investment of fixed asset quadrupled.

In 2005, GDP of the municipality reached 34.56 billion Yuan, fiscal income reached 3.15 billion Yuan, the investment of fixed asset reached 23.1 billion Yuan, the general retail amount of social consumption reached 13.7 billion Yuan, the urban per capita disposable income came to 7,572 Yuan and average pure income of farmers and herdsmen was 2,817 Yuan. Chifeng had been cited as "Pacesetter of National Sand Control and Ecological Construction", "National Sanitary City", "National Model City of supporting army and cherishing the people", "National Perfect Tourism City", "National perfect City in Social Security", "Perfect Area of Spiritual Civilization" and "China's 50 Credit security areas in investment environment".

During "11th Five-Year Plan", Chifeng is further conducting the development strategy of "found the municipality by ecology, strengthen the municipality by industry, prosper the municipality by science and education", by speeding up the process of new type industrialization, Agriculture and animal husbandry industrialization and urbanization, putting stress on industrial economy, project construction and investment introduction, in order to conscientiously increase fiscal income, average income of urban residents and farmers, try to create harmonious Chifeng.

It is planned that, by 2010, GDP will come to 85 billion Yuan, by around 20% up averagely; fiscal income will come to 10 billion Yuan, around 26% up averagely. Through the fast development during "11th Five-year Plan", Chifeng will be built as a producing base of green agricultural and animal husbandry products, energy supply base accessing to northeastern and northern China, important raw material and deep-processing base of nonferrous metal, tourism site of grassland, central city and goods interflow center between Inner Mongolia and Hebei.

Mineral resources
In mineral resources, there are over 70 mineral deposits. The area is rich in coal, oil and gas; nonferrous and ferrous metals, namely iron, tin, zinc, lead, gold, silver, molybdenum etc. have large reserves. Non-metal minerals include limestone, marble, fluorspar, silica, pearlite, bentonite etc.

In agricultural and animal husbandry products, besides the dominant crops of corn, rice, millet, there are cash crops like beans, buckwheat, oil-used sunflower seeds, sugar beets, tobacco, and Chinese herbals. Yearly yield of grains can reach 6 billion Jin. The facility agriculture featured by greenhouse and cold-keeping shed has come to 220,000mu. The area of natural grassland in the municipality is over 8,900mu. The raising livestock is over 14 million all over the municipality.

Power generation
In wind and water resources, there are many large and ideal national-grade wind power plants, and more than 60 large and middle size reservoirs. The ground water amounts to 5 billion m3.

Industries
Major industries include finance, insurance, telecommunications, distribution, logistics, hotels and restaurants, leisure and entertainment. High-tech industrial zone spans .

Transportation
Chifeng is a transportation hub connecting the east and west area of Inner Mongolia.

Rail
Chifeng has direct train service from its train station to Beijing, Harbin, Shenyang, Dalian, Shanhaiguan, and Hebei.

Roads and expressways

 China National Highway 111
 China National Highway 306
 G16 Dandong–Xilinhot Expressway
 G45 Daqing–Guangzhou Expressway

There are 8 provincial and national highways linking Chifeng with surrounding cities, such as Hohhot and cities in Liaoning Province.

Air
Chifeng Yulong Airport has service to major cities such as Beijing, Hohhot, and other cities.

Bus
Chifeng Bus is a bus service serving Chifeng that has 38 lines.

Education
Chifeng University

Famous people
Bao Xishun, recognized as world's tallest man from 2005 until 2007, is from Chifeng, as is his wife.
Siqingaowa, actress.
Wang Luodan, actress.
Zhang Wei (Theway zhang), singer.

References
Notes

Sources
Chifeng (China) -- Britannica Online Encyclopedia
Chifeng Introduction—Chifeng Economic Commission

Literature

See also 

 Chifeng Petroglyphs

External links
  Chifeng City Government
  Chifu City Government
   Sina Cities Alliance - Chifeng
  Chifeng Travel Network (official government)
  Chifeng Train Timetable
  Chifeng local entertainment information site
   Chifeng Daily - Dahongshan evening - Chifeng region's most authoritative news website
  Chifeng Mongolian Web
  Chifeng College
  Chifeng Education Network

 
Cities in Inner Mongolia
Articles containing Mongolian script text
Prefecture-level divisions of Inner Mongolia
National Forest Cities in China